Tubize 2179 is a preserved Belgian  narrow gauge steam locomotive built by Ateliers de Tubize as one of six of its class, and used for most of its life in Poland. It is currently also known as Pacific or Cukrownia Chełmica No.1.

History 
The locomotive was one of a series of six locomotives built in 1935 by Ateliers Métallurgiques in Nivelles and Tubize, specially for a purpose of a transport during a Colonial Exhibition in Brussels. They were miniatures of standard gauge express locomotives, hence they used not typical for a narrow gauge wheel s. They also had other features, like long, low boilers, Wagner-type smoke deflectors, low chimney, low steam collector in a common long housing with a sandbox, and miniature driver booth, not giving shelter. The locomotives were completed at Tubize, which also manufactured boilers. The locomotive with a boiler number 2179 was named Charles and had number 3 in exhibition's stock.

During World War II, the locomotives were seized by the Germans and utilized by them for military or construction railways. The locomotive 2179 was found in 1945 in Stettin (now Szczecin, Poland) and seized by the Polish authorities. It was used for debris removing during the city reconstruction. Then it was sold to sugar factory Ostrowy near Kutno, where it was assigned number 1 and used to haul sugar beet trains. After the factory had converted its lines to  gauge in 1952, the locomotive was given to sugar factory Chełmica near Włocławek (Cukrownia Chełmica), with a stock number 1 (hence it was known as Cukrownia Chełmica No.1). The locomotive, with its distinctive look, was nicknamed Belgijka there (Belgian female).

In 1958 the locomotive was overhauled in Nowy Sącz railway workshops and reconstructed. The driver's booth was much enlarged and became functional, spoiling its proportions however. The chimney and the sandbox were made taller. In 1969,  Chełmica sugar works removed its sugar beet railway, and the locomotive was left at Lipno station for several years. In 1972 it was acquired by the Warsaw Railway Museum and by the end of the 1970s it was given to Narrow Gauge Railway Museum in Wenecja, as a cold exhibit.

References

.

Preserved steam locomotives of Belgium
Preserved steam locomotives of Poland
Narrow gauge steam locomotives of Poland
600 mm gauge railway locomotives
4-6-2 locomotives
2′C1′ n2 locomotives